The Machinery of Freedom is a nonfiction book by David D. Friedman that advocates an anarcho-capitalist society from a consequentialist perspective.

The book was published in 1973, with a second edition in 1989 and a third edition in 2014.

Overview 

The book aims to show that law and its enforcement do not require a state, but can be sustained by non-coercive private enterprise and charity. It explores the consequences of libertarian thought, describes examples of stateless societies (such as the Icelandic Commonwealth) and offers the author's personal statement about why he became a libertarian. Topics addressed in the book include polycentric law and the provision of public goods such as military defense in a stateless society. Friedman argues that a stateless legal system would be beneficial for society as a whole, including the poor.

While some books supporting similar libertarian and anarcho-capitalist views offer support in terms of morality or natural rights, Friedman (although he explicitly denies being a utilitarian) here argues largely in terms of the effects of his proposed policies.

Friedman conjectures that anything done by government costs at least twice as much as a privately provided equivalent, which has been labeled as his eponymous law: "It costs any government at least twice as much to do something as it costs anyone else." He offers examples as evidence such as a comparison of the cost of the United States Postal Service's costs for package delivery with the costs of private carriers and the cost of the Soviet government versus market based services in the West.

Reception 

The Institute of Public Affairs, a libertarian think tank located in Australia, included The Machinery of Freedom in a list of the "Top 20 books you must read before you die" in 2006.

Liberty magazine named the book among The Top Ten Best Libertarian Books, praising Friedman for tackling the problems related to private national defense systems and attempting to solve them.

Related books 

 The Problem of Political Authority by Michael Huemer builds on Friedman's vision of an anarcho-capitalist society in considerable detail
 Chaos Theory by Robert P. Murphy
 Order Without Law by Robert Ellickson
 For a New Liberty by Murray Rothbard
 The Market for Liberty by Linda and Morris Tannehill
 The Enterprise of Law by Bruce L. Benson

See also 

 Dispersed knowledge
 Government success
 Milton Friedman – father of David Friedman
 Tax choice
 X-inefficiency

Notes

References

External links 

 The Machinery of Freedom (full text PDF file of the second edition)
 The Machinery of Freedom (full text PDF file of the third edition)
 The Machinery of Freedom at Friedman's personal website, including free chapters of the book
 "Illustrated Video Summary of The Machinery of Freedom" on YouTube
 "Economics of David D. Friedman's The Machinery of Freedom: Some similarities and dissimilarities to the Austrian school"

1973 non-fiction books
Anarcho-capitalist books